Ravage, in comics, may refer to:

Ravage (Marvel Comics)
Ravage 2099